Edward Emerson Elliott (April 2, 1911 - January 30, 1993) served in the California State Assembly for the 44th and 40th district from 1947 to 1969. During World War II he served in the United States Army.

References

United States Army personnel of World War II
Democratic Party members of the California State Assembly
1911 births
1993 deaths